RT Trianguli Australis, or RT TrA, is a BL Herculis variable (type II Cepheid) in the constellation of Triangulum Australe.

Variable
RT TrA varies between apparent magnitudes 9.4 and 10.2 over a period of 1.95 days. It was first discovered to be variable by Annie Jump Cannon in 1910 and initially classified as an RR Lyrae variable. Later authors segregated it and the similar V533 Centauri as RW Aurigae stars. In time it became clear that RT TrA was unrelated to RW Aur, instead being a member of a group of stars on the instability strip somewhat above the horizontal branch. These stars were then named as a group after BL Herculis, the brightest known member. BL Her stars have periods shorter than eight days. Like other BL Her variables, the light curve of RT TrA has a hump, in this case on the descending branch. The light curve is slightly asymmetric, with the minimum occurring at phase 0.6.

Properties
Its physical properties place it on the instability strip of the H–R diagram.

Carbon star
RT TrA is unusual in that it is a carbon-rich cepheid variable. Unlike true carbon stars, it does not show an excess of s-process elements. It has very high surface abundances of carbon, nitrogen, iron, and some light metals, but not oxygen. The unusual abundances are believed to result from the convection of triple-alpha fusion products to the surface, and so it is expected that there will also be a high proportion of helium. Most other BL Her stars such as U TrA, do not show the same surface carbon excess. The elemental abundances are comparable to the cooler type-R stars.

References

Triangulum Australe
Trianguli Australis, RT
BL Herculis variables
G-type supergiants
G-type bright giants
CPD−62 5377
081157
J16343089-6308009